Jim McCawley (1938–1999, professor of linguistics at the University of Chicago, who wrote his scatolinguistic treatises under the pen names of Quang Phúc Đông and Yuck Foo, both of the fictional South Hanoi Institute of Technology) is credited, on page ix of the preface of Studies out in left field as having "created the interdisciplinary field[s] of pornolinguistics and scatolinguistics virtually on his own" in 1967. Technically, scatolinguistics is the study of the words for various forms of excrement (compare scatology).  But, given the lack of any cognates such as "pornolinguistics" (despite the above) or "coitolinguistics", it has come to cover the study (including etymology and current usage) of all rude and profane expressions.

How linguists view the field 

Although most (if not all) of the words that might be termed scatolingual have been thoroughly studied and described by linguists, scatolinguistics is not generally regarded as a peer-reviewed area or classification of linguistic study. Further, the etymology of this term has been criticised as being more humorous than accurate or appropriate for the range of words it is apparently meant to include.

How the public views the field 
The attitude of the general public towards the field is often to treat it as humor, partly because it is a rich vein for comedians such as George Carlin, or as a minor entertaining diversion. Viz magazine's Profanisaurus is a detailed example. There is definite public interest in the field, although the relation to humor has meant that entertaining false etymologies (such as the "for unlawful carnal knowledge" false etymology) have tended to be more prevalent in popular culture than the results of serious linguistic analysis have.

Scatolinguistic topics in Wikipedia 
 Fuck
 Cunt
 Arse
 Shit

Literature 
 The F Word, Jesse Sheidlower (1999) .
 Studies out in left field 
 Maledicta  ISSN US 0363-3659

External links 
 Epitaph of Jim McCawley
 "A brief outline of English Scatolinguistics" — H2G2 article

Scatolinguistics